Moncler S.p.A. is an Italian luxury fashion house specialized in ready-to-wear outerwear headquartered in Milan, Italy. Since its start as a down jacket boutique, Moncler has expanded to design vests, raincoats, windbreakers, knitwear, leather goods, footwear, fragrance, and related accessories. Its core branding includes the rooster (cockerel), "M" monogram, felt appliqué badge, crossed skis and cartoon duck mascot. 

Founded in 1952 in the Alpine town of Monestier-de-Clermont, France, Moncler quilted jackets were used by cold-weather workers, mountaineers, and skiers throughout Europe. Italian entrepreneur Remo Ruffini bought the near-bankrupt company in 2003 and moved it to Milan, re-launching Moncler as a global purveyor of luxury goods. Its use of private equity financing during the late-2000s and early-2010s saw to its listing on the Milan Stock Exchange in 2013. Moncler reported €2 billion in revenue in 2022. 

The house's collaborations with emerging designers and €1.15 billion-acquisition of Stone Island in 2020, has led to its increased presence in streetwear fashion. Its efforts in sustainable fashion were formalized with their 2020 "Born to Protect" mandate, featuring a range of environmental standards.

History 
Founded in 1952 by René Ramillon and André Vincent, the name is an abbreviation of Monestier-de-Clermont, a village in the mountains near Grenoble, France. The first quilted jackets were conceived for protecting workers from the cold. They used the jackets on top of their overalls in the small mountain establishment. The first to note them and realize their potential was French mountaineer Lionel Terray. The result saw the specialist range "Moncler pour Lionel Terray".

In 1954, Moncler quilted jackets were chosen to equip the Italian expedition to K2, which culminated with the conquest of the earth's second-highest summit by Achille Compagnoni and Lino Lacedelli. Moncler also accompanied the French expedition which reached the summit of Makalu in 1955 and was the official supplier for expeditions in Alaska organised by Lionel Terray in 1964. On occasion of the Grenoble Winter Olympics in 1968, Moncler became the official supplier of the French national downhill skiing team. In 1968, a cartoon duck named MonDuck was introduced as a mascot for the fashion house.

In 2003, Moncler was bought out by Italian entrepreneur Remo Ruffini, chairman and CEO, who was to introduce the strategy of the global quilted jacket, reinventing the near-bankrupt company. Eurazeo, a French shareholder, invested in the Moncler group in 2011, in order to take 45% of the shares and 50% of the voting rights before selling the company for 1.4 billion euros in March 2019.

An IPO of Moncler on the Milan Stock Exchange took place on 16 December 2013, with an initial value of €10.20 per share. The shares were 27 times oversubscribed and rose 47% on the first day, resulting in a market capitalization of more than €4 billion. In February 2018 Moncler launched the Moncler Genius project, a new creative and business model where well-known designers create distinct collections interpreting Moncler's identity that are released on a monthly basis. 

In December 2020, Moncler purchased Italian luxury sportswear brand Stone Island in a reported €1.15 billion acquisition. In 2020, Moncler launched the "Born to Protect" sustainability plan which features renewable energy, animal welfare, recycling, and charitable giving standards. In December 2021 Moncler became the official formalwear partner of Italian football club Inter Milan.

Collections
 Moncler: main line for men and women
 Moncler Enfant: kidswear collection
 Moncler Grenoble: the skiwear collection made its debut in New York in 2010 during New York Fashion Week
 Moncler Gamme Rouge: Moncler's haute couture collection designed by Alessandra Facchinetti and then by Giambattista Valli. From 2008 to 2018, the collection was presented during Paris Fashion Week. The collaboration and collection have concluded with the Spring-Summer 2018 collection.
 Moncler Gamme Bleu: men's collection designed by Thom Browne and presented at Milan Fashion Week. The collaboration and collection have concluded with the Spring-Summer 2018 launch.
Moncler O: A collaboration between Moncler and Off-White c/o Virgil Abloh (Fall-Winter 2016-17 and Spring-Summer 2017 collections)
 Moncler C: A collaboration between Moncler and British designer Craig Green (Fall-Winter 2017-18 and Spring-Summer 2018 collections)

In 2018 Remo Ruffini conceived the Moncler Genius project, where designers create collections interpreting Moncler's identity that are released on a monthly basis.

Collaborations
The following photographers have collaborated with Moncler for institutional campaigns: 
 Bruce Weber (20092014), 
 Annie Leibovitz (20142018) 
 Steven Meisel (Gamme Rouge-related campaigns from 2009 to 2014)
Liu Bolin (Spring-Summer 2017 and Fall-Winter 2017-2018)
Craig McDean (Fall-Winter season 20182019)
Tim Walker (2019)
Poldo Dog Couture (2019)

Major shareholders

Brand integrity
To deal with counterfeiting, the company instituted an online code verification system to authenticate purchased products.

See also
 Italian fashion
 French fashion 
 Après-ski culture 
 Canada Goose, Arc'teryx, Mackage, Woolrich, and Moose Knuckles

References

External links
 

Clothing companies of France
Clothing companies of Italy
Manufacturing companies based in Milan
Clothing companies established in 1952
Italian brands
Outdoor clothing brands
Sporting goods manufacturers of France
Sporting goods manufacturers of Italy
Sportswear brands
1952 establishments in France